Robert Burton (October 20, 1747 – May 31, 1825) was an American farmer, Revolutionary War officer, and planter in what is now Vance County, North Carolina (then Granville County, North Carolina). He was a delegate from North Carolina to the Continental Congress in 1787. Between 1783 and 1815, the North Carolina General Assembly elected him to 13 one-year terms on the Council of State, which at the time was an official advisory panel that the legislature used to check the governor's power.

Early life and career
Robert Burton was born in Goochland County, Colony of Virginia on October 20, 1747.  He was the son of Tabitha Minge and Hutchings Burton and may also have been the grandson of Noel Burton, barrister of Henrico County, Virginia. He moved to Granville County, North Carolina in about 1775 where he married Agatha Williams, daughter of Judge John Williams.

Military service
Military service record:
 Before 1780, a Lieutenant in the Virginia Continental Line 
 Colonel, Granville County Regiment (1780  1782) 
 1780, Assistant Deputy Quartermaster General and Commissary over Hillsborough and Halifax Districts. 
 Stationed at Nutbush/Williamsboro in Granville County (currently Vance County, North Carolina)

Burton was the uncle of Governor Hutchins G. Burton.

References

External links

Continental Congressmen from North Carolina
18th-century American politicians
1747 births
1825 deaths
North Carolina militiamen in the American Revolution